The Philips Sports Manager of the Year is an award for the person considered the most outstanding Irish sports manager or coach of a particular year.

The award is contested by the twelve winners of the year's Philips Sports Manager of the Month Awards, which are open to Irish sports managers, trainers or coaches, or overseas-born managers of Irish teams.

Because the annual ceremony is traditionally held in early December each year, the December winner from the previous year is eligible to compete.

Unusually, the award was instigated not by a sporting body or journalists' association, but by the event sponsors themselves, Philips in 1982.

There have been joint-winners twice. First in 1990, as the achievement of Cork GAA winning the first All-Ireland hurling and football double in exactly 100 years saw respective managers Fr. Michael O'Brien and Billy Morgan honoured. It happened again in 2015 when Irish soccer manager Martin O'Neill and Northern Irish soccer manager Michael O'Neill shared the award for qualifying their respective sides for the 2016 UEFA European Football Championship.

Jack Charlton is the most honoured manager since the award's inception, having won it four times during his tenure as Ireland soccer manager. Declan Kidney is the only person to have won the award for achievements with two different teams at different levels, while Brian Kerr was honoured for success with three different Irish national soccer teams. Joining Charlton, Kidney and Kerr as multi-award winners are Kilkenny hurling supremo Brian Cody and Dublin football supremo Jim Gavin.

Winners

Multiple winners

Winners by sport

References

1982 establishments in Ireland
Awards established in 1982
Coaching awards
Irish sports coaches
Man
Lists of Irish sportspeople
Philips